Pandanus kaida is a monocot species of plant in the family Pandanaceae, known only in cultivation. It is native to India, Sri Lanka. Provided the appearance of its fruit, the species is sometimes referred to as the false pineapple, despite not belonging to the pineapple genus.

In culture
"Weta keyiya" (sinhala).

Uses
live fencing; medicinal; pollen-insect repellent. 
leaves- mats, boxes, hats.

References

 http://indiabiodiversity.org/species/show/259135
 

Flora of Sri Lanka
kaida
Plants described in 1869